Bear Lake County is a county in the U.S. state of Idaho. As of the 2020 United States Census the county had a population of 6,372. The county seat is Paris, and Montpelier is the largest city.

The northern half of the 20-mile-long (32 km) lake is in Idaho, the southern half in Utah. The county was established in 1875 in the Idaho Territory, fifteen years before statehood.

History
Peg-Leg Smith established a trading post on the Oregon Trail from 1848 to 1850 near Dingle.

The first settlement in the Bear Lake Valley was Paris, settled by Mormon pioneers led by Charles Rich on September 26, 1863; thirty families comprised the original settlement. In the spring of 1864, Montpelier was settled on the other side of the valley on the Oregon Trail. Bear Lake County was established in 1875, and the railroad was extended through Montpelier in 1892.

Geography
Bear Lake County comprises the state's southeast corner. Its east boundary line abuts the west line of the state of Wyoming and its south boundary line abuts the north line of the state of Utah. The county is centered on Bear Lake Valley and includes the surrounding mountain ranges.

Adjacent counties

 Caribou County - north
 Lincoln County, Wyoming - east
 Rich County, Utah - south
 Franklin County - west

Major highways

  - US 30
  - US 89
  - SH-36
  - SH-61

National protected areas
 Bear Lake National Wildlife Refuge
 Cache National Forest (part)
 Caribou National Forest (part)

Demographics

2000 census
As of the 2000 United States Census, there were 6,411 people, 2,259 households, and 1,710 families in the county. The population density was 7 people per square mile (3/km2). There were 3,268 housing units at an average density of 3 per square mile (1/km2). The racial makeup of the county was 97.66% White, 0.09% Black or African American, 0.53% Native American, 0.08% Asian, 0.05% Pacific Islander, 1.08% from other races, and 0.51% from two or more races. 2.40% of the population were Hispanic or Latino of any race. 28.6% were of English, 16.1% American, 9.4% German, 7.1% Danish, 6.2% Swiss and 5.5% Swedish ancestry.

There were 2,259 households, out of which 38.80% had children under the age of 18 living with them, 66.90% were married couples living together, 6.40% had a female householder with no husband present, and 24.30% were non-families. 22.20% of all households were made up of individuals, and 12.10% had someone living alone who was 65 years of age or older. The average household size was 2.81 and the average family size was 3.33.

The county population contained 33.00% under the age of 18, 7.40% from 18 to 24, 22.40% from 25 to 44, 21.70% from 45 to 64, and 15.60% who were 65 years of age or older. The median age was 36 years. For every 100 females there were 98.40 males. For every 100 females age 18 and over, there were 96.70 males.

The median income for a household in the county was $32,162, and the median income for a family was $38,351. Males had a median income of $33,958 versus $17,829 for females. The per capita income for the county was $13,592. About 7.10% of families and 9.60% of the population were below the poverty line, including 11.30% of those under age 18 and 9.20% of those age 65 or over.

2010 census
As of the 2010 United States Census, there were 5,986 people, 2,281 households, and 1,661 families in the county. The racial makeup of the county was 96.3% white, 0.5% American Indian, 0.4% Asian, 0.1% black or African American, 1.6% from other races, and 1.1% from two or more races. Those of Hispanic or Latino origin made up 3.6% of the population. In terms of ancestry, 37.1% were English, 10.2% were German, 8.0% were American, and 7.6% were Danish.

Of the 2,281 households, 32.4% had children under the age of 18 living with them, 63.3% were married couples living together, 6.3% had a female householder with no husband present, 27.2% were non-families, and 24.0% of all households were made up of individuals. The average household size was 2.61 and the average family size was 3.12. The median age was 40.5 years.

The median income for a household in the county was $43,374 and the median income for a family was $47,092. Males had a median income of $39,023 versus $26,417 for females. The per capita income for the county was $19,284. About 11.2% of families and 13.9% of the population were below the poverty line, including 14.1% of those under age 18 and 12.0% of those age 65 or over.

Communities

Cities

 Bloomington
 Georgetown
 Montpelier
 Paris
 St. Charles

Census-designated place
 Bennington

Unincorporated communities

 Alton
 Bern
 Dingle
 Fish Haven
 Geneva
 Liberty
 Nounan
 Ovid
 Pegram
 Raymond
 Wardboro
 Wooleys

Politics
Bear Lake County voters have been reliably Republican for several decades. In only one national election since 1948 has the county selected the Democratic Party candidate.

See also

 Black Bear Resort
 List of counties in Idaho
 National Register of Historic Places listings in Bear Lake County, Idaho

References

External links
 
 State of Idaho official site - Bear Lake County
 News-Examiner - Montpelier newspaper
 Bear Lake Valley Convention & Visitors Bureau
 Bear Lake County School District #33
 The rights of citizenship : brief in re H.R. Bills no. 1478, 6153, and the Petition of the citizens of Bear Lake County, Idaho Territory (1885?)

 

 
Idaho counties
Bear River (Great Salt Lake)
1875 establishments in Idaho Territory
Populated places established in 1875